Diera-Zehren is a municipality in the district of Meißen, in Saxony, Germany.

References 

Meissen (district)